is a Japanese mixed martial artist and judoka. Yokota became famous fighting in the Japanese MMA promotion DEEP, and eventually debuted WVR Sengoku, his only fight in a cage was his MMA debut, which was on 19 September 2004 against Keita Nakamura, the fight resulted in a draw.

Career and background
Yokota has a background in Judo and fights for Team Grabaka with notable training partners such as Akihiro Gono and Kazuo Misaki. Yokota debuted MMA in GCM demolition in September 2004 where he faced off against Keita Nakamura, the 2 round fight resulted in a draw. After his first fight Yokota debuted the Japanese promotion DEEP and went undefeated in his next eight fights till he suffered his first loss by knockout at the hands of Tae Hyun Bang. His most famous fight was against former Sengoku 155 pound champion, Satoru Kitaoka, which he lost by unanimous decision. His next fight will be against Eiji Mitsuoka in Sengoku 11. On December 22, 2009, it was announced that Yokota would be taking on DREAM Lightweight Tatsuya Kawajiri in a Sengoku vs. DREAM fight at the annual Dynamite!! event on New Year's Eve in Saitama, Japan.

Championships and accomplishments
Deep
Deep Featherweight Championship (one time)
One Successful Title Defense
Deep Lightweight Championship (one time)

Sengoku Raiden Championship
2008 Sengoku Lightweight Grand Prix Runner Up

Mixed martial arts record

| Loss
| align=center| 26–9–3
| Eiji Ishikawa
| Decision (split)
| Deep - 84 Impact: Differ Ariake Final Day
| 
| align=center| 3
| align=center| 5:00
| Tokyo, Japan
|
|-
| Loss
| align=center| 26–8–3
| Christian Lee
| Submission (guillotine choke)
| ONE Championship: Visions of Victory
| 
| align=center| 2
| align=center| 4:34
| Kuala Lumpur, Malaysia
|
|-
| Win
| align=center| 26–7–3
| Da Won Yoon
| Decision (split)
| Deep - 81 Impact
| 
| align=center| 3
| align=center| 5:00
| Tokyo, Japan
|
|-
| Loss
| align=center| 25–7–3
| Martin Nguyen
| KO (punch)
| ONE Championship: Quest For Power
| 
| align=center| 1
| align=center| 3:36
| Jakarta, Indonesia
|
|-
| Loss
| align=center| 25–6–3
| Marat Gafurov
| Submission (rear-naked choke)
| ONE Championship: Kingdom of Champions
| 
| align=center| 2
| align=center| 4:25
| Bangkok, Thailand
| 
|-
| Win
| align=center| 25–5–3
| Masakazu Imanari
| Decision (unanimous)
| Deep - 74 Impact
| 
| align=center| 3
| align=center| 5:00
| Tokyo, Japan
|
|-
| Win
| align=center| 24–5–3
| Kenjiro Takahashi
| Decision (unanimous)
| Deep - Cage Impact 2015
| 
| align=center| 3
| align=center| 5:00
| Tokyo, Japan
| 
|-
| Win
| align=center| 23–5–3
| Juri Ohara
| Decision (unanimous)
| Deep - Funabashi Bom-Ba-Ye
| 
| align=center| 2
| align=center| 10:00
| Funabashi, Chiba, Japan
| 
|-
| Win
| align=center| 22–5–3
| Isao Kobayashi
| Decision (unanimous)
| Deep - Dream Impact 2014: Omisoka Special
| 
| align=center| 3
| align=center| 5:00
| Saitama, Japan
|
|-
| Win
| align=center| 21–5–3
| Yusuke Kagiyama
| Submission (kimura)
| Deep: 68 Impact
| 
| align=center| 1
| align=center| 2:38
| Tokyo, Japan
| 
|-
| Win
| align=center| 20–5–3
| Katsunori Tsuda
| Decision (unanimous)
| Deep: 66 Impact
| 
| align=center| 3
| align=center| 5:00
| Tokyo, Japan
| 
|-
| Win
| align=center| 19–5–3
| Doo Ri Song
| TKO (punches)
| Deep: Cage Impact 2013
| 
| align=center| 2
| align=center| 4:00
| Tokyo, Japan
| 
|-
| Win
| align=center| 18–5–3
| Woon Gyeom Kim
| Submission (armlock)
| Deep Cage Impact 2013: Korakuen Hall
| 
| align=center| 1
| align=center| 4:02
| Tokyo, Japan
| 
|-
| Win
| align=center| 17–5–3
| Shoji Maruyama
| Decision (unanimous)
| Deep: 61 Impact
| 
| align=center| 3
| align=center| 5:00
| Tokyo, Japan
| 
|-
| Win
| align=center| 16–5–3
| Anatoly Safronov
| Submission (rear-naked choke)
| Abu Dhabi Warriors 1
| 
| align=center| 3
| align=center| 4:07
| Abu Dhabi, UAE
| 
|-
| Win
| align=center| 15–5–3
| Hideki Kadowaki
| Decision (unanimous)
| Deep - 57 Impact
| 
| align=center| 3
| align=center| 5:00
| Tokyo, Japan
| 
|-
| Win
| align=center| 14–5–3
| Katsuya Toida
| TKO (soccer kicks and punches)
| Deep: Cage Impact 2011 in Tokyo, 1st Round
| 
| align=center| 2
| align=center| 0:25
| Tokyo, Japan
| 
|-
| Win
| align=center| 13–5–3
| Shoji Maruyama
| Decision (unanimous)
| Deep: 54 Impact
| 
| align=center| 3
| align=center| 5:00
| Tokyo, Japan
| 
|-
| Loss
| align=center| 12–5–3
| Jadamba Narantungalag
| KO (punch)
| World Victory Road Presents: Soul of Fight
| 
| align=center| 1
| align=center| 2:03
| Tokyo, Japan
| 
|-
| Loss
| align=center| 12–4–3
| Brian Cobb
| Decision (split)
| World Victory Road Presents: Sengoku Raiden Championships 15
| 
| align=center| 3
| align=center| 5:00
| Tokyo, Japan
| 
|-
| Loss
| align=center| 12–3–3
| Tatsuya Kawajiri
| Decision (unanimous)
| Dynamite!! The Power of Courage 2009
| 
| align=center| 3
| align=center| 5:00
| Saitama, Japan
| 
|-
| Win
| align=center| 12–2–3
| Eiji Mitsuoka
| Decision (unanimous)
| World Victory Road Presents: Sengoku 11
| 
| align=center| 3
| align=center| 5:00
| Tokyo, Japan
| 
|-
| Win
| align=center| 11–2–3
| Ryan Schultz
| KO (punch)
| World Victory Road Presents: Sengoku 10
| 
| align=center| 1
| align=center| 2:31
| Saitama, Japan
| 
|-
| Win
| align=center| 10–2–3
| Leonardo Santos
| Decision (split)
| World Victory Road Presents: Sengoku 8
| 
| align=center| 3
| align=center| 5:00
| Saitama, Japan
| 
|-
| Loss
| align=center| 9–2–3
| Satoru Kitaoka
| Decision (unanimous)
| World Victory Road Presents: Sengoku 6
| 
| align=center| 3
| align=center| 5:00
| Saitama, Japan
| 
|-
| Win
| align=center| 9–1–3
| Mizuto Hirota
| Decision (unanimous)
| World Victory Road Presents: Sengoku 6
| 
| align=center| 3
| align=center| 5:00
| Saitama, Japan
| 
|-
| Win
| align=center| 8–1–3
| Bojan Kosednar
| Decision (unanimous)
| World Victory Road Presents: Sengoku 4
| 
| align=center| 3
| align=center| 5:00
| Saitama, Japan
| 
|-
| Loss
| align=center| 7–1–3
| Tae Hyun Bang
| KO (punches)
| Deep: 35 Impact
| 
| align=center| 1
| align=center| 3:38
| Tokyo, Japan
| 
|-
| Win
| align=center| 7–0–3
| Minoru Tavares Tsuchiya
| Submission (armbar)
| Deep: 31 Impact
| 
| align=center| 1
| align=center| 3:53
| Tokyo, Japan
| 
|-
| Win
| align=center| 6–0–3
| Nobuhiro Obiya
| Decision (unanimous)
| Deep: 28 Impact
| 
| align=center| 3
| align=center| 5:00
| Tokyo, Japan
| 
|-
| Win
| align=center| 5–0–3
| Yoshihiro Tomioka
| Decision (majority)
| Deep: 27 Impact
| 
| align=center| 2
| align=center| 5:00
| Tokyo, Japan
| 
|-
| Win
| align=center| 4–0–3
| Michihiro Omigawa
| Decision (majority)
| Deep: 26 Impact
| 
| align=center| 3
| align=center| 5:00
| Tokyo, Japan
| 
|-
| Draw
| align=center| 3–0–3
| Milton Vieira
| Draw
| Deep: 24 Impact
| 
| align=center| 2
| align=center| 5:00
| Tokyo, Japan
| 
|-
| Win
| align=center| 3–0–2
| Kosuto Umeda
| TKO (punches)
| Deep: 23 Impact
| 
| align=center| 2
| align=center| 4:05
| Tokyo, Japan
| 
|-
| Draw
| align=center| 2–0–2
| Yoshihiro Tomioka
| Draw
| Deep: clubDeep Toyama: Barbarian Festival 3
| 
| align=center| 2
| align=center| 5:00
| Toyama, Japan
| 
|-
| Win
| align=center| 2–0–1
| Hiroki Nagaoka
| Decision (unanimous)
| Deep: 20th Impact
| 
| align=center| 2
| align=center| 5:00
| Tokyo, Japan
| 
|-
| Win
| align=center| 1–0–1
| Daigo Ishijima
| Technical Submission (armbar)
| Pancrase: Spiral 5
| 
| align=center| 1
| align=center| 4:41
| Yokohama, Japan
| 
|-
| Draw
| align=center| 0–0–1
| Keita Nakamura
| Draw
| GCM - Demolition 040919
| 
| align=center| 2
| align=center| 5:00
| Tokyo, Japan
|

See also
 List of current mixed martial arts champions
 List of male mixed martial artists

References

External links

1978 births
Living people
People from Funabashi
Japanese male mixed martial artists
Lightweight mixed martial artists
Featherweight mixed martial artists
Mixed martial artists utilizing judo
Mixed martial artists utilizing shootfighting
Japanese male judoka
Sportspeople from Chiba Prefecture
Deep (mixed martial arts) champions